The Mount Vernon School (MVPS or MV) is a private, Christian, (Presbyterian), independent, coeducational day school in Sandy Springs, Georgia, United States, with an Atlanta postal address. It was founded in 1972. The Mount Vernon School is also known as Mount Vernon Presbyterian School.

History
Located in Sandy Springs, Georgia, Mount Vernon was founded in 1972. The School has grown from a multi-day preschool to being a nationally-renowned full-service preparatory educational institution serving families with children ages 6 months to grade 12. The Mount Vernon School is an active participant in national conversations around K-12 integration of design thinking, student collaboration and the advancement of K12 education having been host to and speakers at various major conferences nationwide.
Mount Vernon utilizes Design Thinking and Project Based Learning to encourage student engagement in real-world, people-centered problem solving. Students at Mount Vernon have and/or are actively collaborating with corporations and nonprofits such as Delta, Porsche, AT&T, National Center for Civil and Human Rights, Chick-fil-a, and Magic Wheelchair Project to produce "market-ready-prototypes". MVIFI was rebranded in 2018 as  Mount Vernon Ventures. It continues as a research and strategy lab partnering in school transformation worldwide. In 2019, the School completed construction of its new Upper School building.

Campus
Mount Vernon School sits on 37 acres in the Sandy Springs community of Atlanta. Academic buildings for Early Preschool to grade 5 are located on the Lower Campus at 471 Mount Vernon HWY NE, sharing space with Mount Vernon Presbyterian Church. Middle School (grades 6-8) and Upper School (grades 9-12) academic buildings are located at 510 Mount Vernon HWY on the Upper Campus. Mount Vernon's athletics facilities include a turf football/soccer/ lacrosse field, running track, baseball and softball field, and the Mustang Athletic Center (MAC) which houses dedicated locker rooms, on-site sports medicine facilities, and weight training center.

Facilities
The School’s Upper Campus contains the following facilities: Black Box theater, Virtual/Augmented Reality Lab, multiple Maker Spaces, multiple Science Labs, fine arts studios (painting, drawing, printmaking, ceramics), modern/college inspired dining facilities, coffee shop, school store, administrative and college counseling offices, and multiple community spaces.
The Middle School Academic Building provides learning in the following spaces: Maker and Innovation Space (The Hive), gymnasium, Black Box theater, dining, studio art facilities, art gallery, and student counseling office.

Preschool and Lower School share the following facilities: Maker Space (Studio-i), gymnasium, theater, chapel, dining, turf outdoor recreation fields, The Frontier outdoor play space. Shared facilities with Mount Vernon Presbyterian Church include the church Sanctuary and Fellowship Hall.

Mount Vernon completed construction of the 60,000 s/ft Upper School building in July 2019. The 4-story building can accommodate approximately 400 students in grades 9-12 as well as by students and faculty of all grade levels and divisions. The building was constructed through the collaboration of several local and regional businesses including: Flags of Origin, MJO Studio, FLIK Dining, and View Dynamic Glass. The Upper School Building spaces are outfitted with furnishings from VS America, Hay, Bend Goods, Industry West, and West Elm. The interior features are hand-painted wayfinding and murals by Atlanta artist Chris Sturdivant.

Academics
Mount Vernon offers an educational experience from infants to grade 12. Mount Vernon uses inquiry-based learning methods to engage students in project work, design thinking, and visible thinking routines, with the goal of creating an environment in which learners can develop strong empathy and problem solving skills. As a means to actively work toward furthering educational processes, Mount Vernon has partnered with organizations such as the Buck Institute for Education, the Stanford d.School, IDEA, and Harvard University’s Project Zero.

Design thinking
Through design thinking, project-based learning, and maker design and engineering efforts, students engage with their community in order to solve real problems affecting organizations (both private and non-profit). Students have collaborated with for-profit and nonprofit organizations to create bio-engineering solutions, draft digital blueprints, redesign corporate collateral, and consult.

School divisions
The Mount Vernon School Preschool serves children from six weeks of age through 5 years of age. Nationally accredited by NAEYC (the National Association for the Education of Young Children), the school offers class sizes and teacher:child ratios below the national average.
The Preschool is open from August–May and follows The Mount Vernon School’s calendar for breaks and teacher professional learning days. Open from 8:00 a.m. to 12:00 p.m. for half-day students and 8:00 a.m. to 6:00 p.m. for full time students. Early drop off is available for both full and part time students beginning at 7:30 at no additional fee. 
The Preschool and Early Preschool Programs focus to promote optimum development of each child enrolled. There is no defined separation between learning and caring, play and work. Individual child development goals are drawn from NAEYC (National Association for the Education of Young Children) and the Project Approach, which include:

Promoting all aspects of development including: physical (gross and fine motor); social (awareness, respect, ability to share and cooperate); communication (verbal and non-verbal); self-esteem (self-awareness and positive self-image); and cognitive (comprehension, problem solving, and skill acquisition)
Encouraging each child to develop his or her unique individual talents
Developing a foundation that promotes individual success in the future
Creating an “active learning” environment in which to develop

College Counseling/Post-Secondary Preparedness

Mount Vernon offers a comprehensive college counseling process with broad support for students in Grades 9 and 10 and individualized counseling in Grades 11 and 12. College counselors work with students to ensure that all Mount Vernon learners are prepared for success in college and beyond.

Advanced Placement (AP)
Mount Vernon offers 15 Advanced Placement Courses including: Biology, Calculus AB, Calculus BC, Chemistry, Computer Science, English Language & Composition, English Literature & Composition, Environmental Science, Government, Micro and Macro Economics, Physics 1, Statistics, United States History, and World History.

iProject
iProject is a program for students in grades 9-12 to design, draft, and pitch a self-directed project to a panel of internal and external experts for the sole purpose of solving a problem, creating a prototype, and packaging the solution all with a specific user in mind.

Notable alumni

 James Banks III (born 1998), basketball player in the Israeli Basketball Premier League
Amin Stevens (born 1990), professional basketball player for Ironi Kiryat Ata in the Israeli Basketball Premier League

References

Educational institutions established in 1972
Private K-12 schools in Sandy Springs, Georgia
Presbyterian schools in the United States
Christian schools in Georgia (U.S. state)